Parliamentary elections were held in Serbia on 24 April 2016. Initially, the election were originally due to be held by March 2018, but on 17 January 2016 Prime Minister Aleksandar Vučić called for a snap election claiming Serbia "needs four more years of stability so that it is ready to join the European Union". The elections were held simultaneously with provincial elections in Vojvodina and nationwide local elections.

Voter turnout was 56%. Vučić's Serbian Progressive Party-led coalition retained its majority, winning 131 of the 250 seats. In contrast to the 2014 elections, a record-breaking seven non-minority lists passed the 5% threshold. Several parties returned to the National Assembly, including the Serbian Radical Party, the Liberal Democratic Party and the Democratic Party of Serbia, while three parties entered for the first time; the liberal Enough is Enough, the conservative Dveri (in coalition with the Democratic Party of Serbia) and the Green Party (as a Slovak ethnic minority list).

Vučić announced formation of the new government by early June. He stated that the Alliance of Vojvodina Hungarians were the only certain partners in the cabinet, and remained ambiguous about the future cooperation with the Socialist Party of Serbia, the coalition partners in the previous government. After a two-month delay, Vučić announced the new cabinet on 8 August, consisting of eight old and eight new ministers, retaining the coalition with the Socialist Party. The government was approved by the National Assembly on 10 August.

Electoral system
The 250 members of the National Assembly are elected by proportional representation in a single nationwide constituency with a 5% electoral threshold (with the percentages calculated including the invalid and blank votes cast), although the threshold is disregarded for coalitions representing ethnic minorities. Seats are allocated using the d'Hondt method.

Campaign
In November 2014 Dveri and the Democratic Party of Serbia declared that they would contest the elections as the "Patriotic Bloc" alliance. In January 2015 PULS and SLS also joined the bloc.

On 19 February 2016, the Party of United Pensioners of Serbia (PUPS) decided to leave the coalition with SPS, and sign an agreement with SNS, as did the SDPS.

DS, SDS and the LDP agreed to form a coalition called "Democratic Serbia - DS-LDP-SDS", with Dragoljub Mićunović as the leader. However, on 28 February DS leader Bojan Pajtić said that his party would not join the SDS and the LDP in a pre-election coalition.

Electoral lists
The Republic Electoral Commission (RIK) published an official list of competing parties and coalitions.

 —

Opinion polls

Results

Aftermath

After the polls closed, it soon became clear that the Serbian Progressive Party would maintain its absolute majority in the Assembly, albeit with a smaller number of MPs, and that their partners, the Socialist Party of Serbia, would maintain their standing. However, the Republic Electoral Commission (RIK) and organizations monitoring the election (such as CeSID) were cautious about the results of most other lists, as they hovered around the 5% threshold. For a while, it looked as if all seven main contestants would pass the threshold, but as the Commission published the final results on Thursday 28 April, the DSS-Dveri coalition ended up a single vote short. Tensions ran high, as the participants started to accuse each other and the Commission of fraud, which along with demolition of Savamala resulted in start of protests. Still, there were additional 18,000 votes to share, as voting had to be repeated at 15 polling stations due to irregularities. In the re-run held on 4 May, DSS–Dveri comfortably won the required number of votes and ended up with 5.03% of the electorate. The Electoral Commission released the final results of the election on Thursday 5 May.

Vučić announced formation of the new government by early June. He stated that the Alliance of Vojvodina Hungarians were the only certain partners in the cabinet, and remained ambiguous about the future cooperation with the Socialist Party of Serbia, the coalition partners in the previous government, hinting that he will "certainly not form a government with someone who can't wait to stab him in the back."

Constitutive session of the new parliament was held on 3 June. Maja Gojković of Serbian Progressive Party was re-elected president, and six vice-presidents from major parliamentary clubs were elected. The seventh vice-presidential seat, reserved for Enough is Enough, was left unfilled after the movement refused to propose their candidate despite previous agreement.

Formation of the new government, however, took much longer than announced. On 23 July PM-designate Aleksandar Vučić said he was not ruling out the possibility that Serbia's government could be "formed by somebody else at his proposal", stating that "we have problems, this is not about some kind of whim", but without elaborating the details. Fueled by hints from Vučić and statements made by his associates, media started speculating on external pressures, pointing at Western and Russian attempts to influence personal solutions in the new cabinet. President Nikolić expressed "full understanding" that the government had not been formed yet, and stated that the only important thing is that the constitutional deadlines [three months from constitution of the Assembly] are met.

Vučić announced the new cabinet on 8 August, consisting of eight old and eight new ministers, retaining a coalition with the Socialist Party. The government was approved by the National Assembly on 10 August.

References

Serbia
Elections in Serbia
Parliamentary
Serbia